Greatest Love Songs is a compilation album by Joe Cocker, released in 2003 (see 2003 in music).

Track listing
"Just Like a Woman" − 5:18
"Something" − 3:34
"Darling Be Home Soon" − 4:42
"The Moon Is a Harsh Mistress" − 3:30
"You Are So Beautiful" − 2:44
"Performance" − 4:39
"If I Love You" − 3:54
"The Jealous Kind" − 3:50
"A Song for You" − 6:25
"Many Rivers to Cross" − 3:45
"Just Like Always" − 3:26
"Up Where We Belong" − 3:53
"Sorry Seems to Be the Hardest Word" − 3:59
"Have a Little Faith in Me" − 4:41
"Out of the Blue" − 3:47
"Heart Full of Rain" − 4:49
"Tonight" − 4:48
"That's the Way Her Love Is" − 2:43

References

Joe Cocker compilation albums
2003 compilation albums